Scytasis sericea is a species of beetle in the family Cerambycidae. It was described by James Clark Molesworth Gardner in 1930.

References

Saperdini
Beetles described in 1930